When is a studio album by Vincent Gallo, released on Warp in 2001. It peaked at number 44 on the UK Independent Albums Chart.

Critical reception

Tim DiGravina of AllMusic gave the album 4.5 stars out of 5, saying, "With its smart, confident arrangements, consistent tone, and fascinating personal themes, the album sees Gallo making a bold, confident, and mature musical step of considerable relevance." James Keast of Exclaim! described it as "an atypical, eccentric and occasionally atonal exploration of simple sounds and dissonant piano and guitar plinking."

Alex Needham of NME said, "Gallo may not be renowned for subtlety in his life, but he’s a master of it in his work." David M. Pecoraro of Pitchfork gave the album a 7.3 out of 10, describing it as "a gorgeous collection of songs which paint an undeniably clear picture of their creator."

In 2015, Clash included it on the "7 of the Best: Albums by Artists More Famous for Other Things" list.

Track listing

Charts

References

External links
 
 
 When at Warp

2001 albums
Warp (record label) albums
Vincent Gallo albums